Albert Vallvé i Navarro (2 December 1945 – 7 March 2021) was a Spanish politician. He was elected as member of the Senate of Spain representing the Province of Tarragona for Convergence and Union in 1993.

References

1945 births
2021 deaths
Convergence and Union politicians
Members of the Senate of Spain